Veterans Day is an annual United States holiday honoring military veterans.

Veterans Day or Veteran's Day or Veterans' Day may also refer to:
National Veterans' Day, a remembrance day in Finland
Veterans Day (Netherlands)
Veterans Day (Norway)
Veterans Day (South Korea)
Veterans Day (Sweden)
Veterans' Day (United Kingdom) or Armed Forces Day
 Veterans Day (album) by MC Eiht, 2004
"Veteran's Day", a song and music video by Rick Ross featuring Lil Wayne and Birdman

See also
Armistice Day, 11 November observances in other countries, e.g. New Zealand, France, Belgium and Serbia (former name of Veterans Day in the United States)
Remembrance Day, 11 November observances in the Commonwealth of Nations